Coilostylis is a genus of orchids. It was split off from the "supergenus" Epidendrum in 2004 although the Kew currently does not recognize this genus.  This genus features pseudobulbs, large bracts around the flowers, and  flowers that are typically resupinate, with the trilobate lip adnate to the column and having a long thin midlobe.  It is not unusual for this genus to produce keikes.

Species 
 C. ciliare, recognized by Kew as E. ciliare, is the type species of Coilostylis

 C. claviata is native to Costa Rica.  In the opinion of Kew, the name of this taxon is E. purpurascens

 C. cuspidata, formerly E. cuspidatum is often confused with C. ciliare.
 C. falcata is  a lithophyte from Mexico. The leaves are "sicle shaped," hence falcata.  A picture may be found at
https://web.archive.org/web/20110707075515/http://www.abundaflora.com/epi_falcatum.htm

 C. lacertina, formerly E. lacertinum.  Harding has contributed a photo which can be found at The Internet Orchid Species Photo Encyclopedia.
 C. oerstedii, formerly E. oerstedii, native to Costa Rica and Panama, has green-white flowers and a diamond-shaped elongated midlobe on the lip.  Although sometimes cited as Epidendrum ciliare var oerstedii, the lateral lobes of the lip are not ciliate.  A nice picture can be found at
http://www.orchidspecies.com/coiloerstedii.htm

 C. parkinsoniana, formerly E. parkinsonianum has fragrant flowers which closely resemble but are much larger than the flowers of E. nocturnum, the type species of Epidendrum.  Some pictures can be found at http://www.acao.cat/wiki/index.php?title=Coilostylis_parkinsoniana&redirect=no
 C. vivipara (Lindl.) Withner & P.A.Harding, formerly E. viviparum, has fusiform pseudobulbs bearing two leaves, membranacious bracts as long as the ovary, and unfringed lateral lobes of the lip.  This species was named for its habit of producing many keikeis.  A photo of a plant, with a flowering keikei, can be found at
http://www.orchidspecies.com/orphotdir/epipurpurescens.jpg
A digitized version of the original publication in Ewdwards's Botanical Register can be found on page 10 (after the plates) of
http://www.botanicus.org/item/31753002748405

Acceptance 

Although the existence of the taxon Coilostylis is hard to deny, there remains some debate about its rank:  is this a genus, subgenus, section, or subsection?  A brief summary of recent thought (since the publication of The Debatable Epidendrums) is provided.

In January, 2005, The Royal Botanic Gardens, Kew, published Orchid Research Newsletter Number 45, announcing that Volume 4 of Genera Orchidacearum was being sent to the printers.  This Newsletter listed the new assignment of species to Coilostylis.  (This reference can be found at
https://web.archive.org/web/20080910155302/http://www.kew.org/herbarium/orchid/orn45.pdf)

As recently as December 2007, The RHS Orchid Hybrid Registration Authority was still calling Coilostylis vivipara by the name "Epidendrum viviparum Lindl."  In the same issue of Orchid Review, the RHS announced that the changes in Volume 4 of Genera Orchidacearum were now reflected in new registrations.  (This reference can be found at
https://web.archive.org/web/20090124092635/http://rhs.org.uk/NR/rdonlyres/EB660871-3BBF-43B1-8DB6-5ECF714E7C7F/0/orrevMar08.pdf) Nevertheless, as of January 2022, all Coilostylis species are treated as members of Epidendrum, according to World Flora Online (http://www.worldfloraonline.org/search?query=Coilostylis&limit=24&start=0&sort=)

Sources 
Withner, C. A. and Harding, P. A.,  Cattleyas and Their Relatives. The Debatable Epidendrums Timber Press 2004.

References

 
Epidendreae genera